Kirwan House or The Female Orphan House was a Church of Ireland-run female orphanage on Dublin's North Circular Road and latterly in Ranelagh.

History
The Female Orphan Society was established in Dublin, in 1790 (possibly Ireland's oldest Charity, incorporated in one of the last acts of the Irish Parliament before the Act of Union in 1800). 

"Destitute Girls" (whose both parents were deceased) were placed in the home, and were instructed in the Protestant faith and were trained to be domestic servants. 

The Female Orphan House was founded by Mrs. Ann Tighe and Mrs. Margaret Este (who died in 1791 and was succeeded by Elizabeth La Touche) initially in a small property on Prussia Street but moved near by to larger premises on North Circular Road, built on the land of Charles Stanley Monck, Esq and named Kirwan House after the Dean of Killala, Walter Blake Kirwan, who preached sermons regarding the establishment of such an institution.    

After the Female Orphan House moved to the North Circular Road in 1793, the 42 Prussia Street building became The Orphan House for Destitute Boys, which operated until the early-19th century.

The architect of the Chapel on the North Circular Road, built-in 1818 was William Farrell renowned for many Church of Ireland buildings, and contained plasterwork by the renowned stuccodore George Stapleton. The Chapel was opened by Bishop Charles Brodrick (whose family were associated with the institution) and Bishop John Jebb preached the sermon.

The Home was visited by George IV in 1821 during his visit to Ireland. stopping on his way to the Viceroys Lodge in the Phoenix Park. The king ordered shirts from the orphanage produced by the orphans' needlework, and he presented 100 wooden bedsteads to the home.

The home had accommodation for 160 orphans and an episcopal chapel. For a time some land in the Phoenix Park was allocated to the home to provide cattle for the production of milk.

Regardless of their religion before entering the Institution, the girls were brought up in the Anglican faith. The Institution was funded through government grants, subscriptions, donations, and the proceeds of the work of the girls.

The La Touche family having a long history associated with the home, William Blake Kirwan named his son Anthony La Touche Kirwan, Peter La Touche and his brother John were governors of Kirwan House, Peters's wife, Elizabeth, was headmistress, in 1942 the last La Touche associated with the Home Miss Mary La Touche who was governor died.

Rev. Charles Dickinson DD, who became Anglican Bishop of Meath served as chaplain to the home for 12 years, from 1822 to 1833 years, visiting the home twice a week to deliver religious instruction. Rev. Cadwallader Wolseley served as chaplain and secretary, for 20 years from 1833 to 1853, and governor until his death. 

A Brief Record of The Female Orphan House, North Circular Road, Dublin, For over one hundred years, from 1790 to 1892 was printed in 1893 about the orphanage.

The Church of Ireland Archbishop of Dublin would have been chair of the board of governors, The Queen was the patroness and president, and the Dowager Duchess of Abercorn was the vice patroness. 
 
In 1943 another Protestant run orphanage Belvedere Protestant Children's Orphanage, in Westmeath, closed and the remaining four orphans were transferred to Kirwan House.

Kirwan House would have been associated with another Church of Ireland designated Mother and Child Home, the Bethany Home, with mothers and children transferred between them

Chaplains
 Rev. Henry Campbell A.B. - 1791 
 Rev. Charles Mayne - 1816 
 Rev. J. R. Cotter - 1818 
 Rev. Charles Dickinson DD - 1831
 Rev. Cadwallader Wolsely MA - 1833 
 Rev. Edward Lysaght - 1853 
 Rev. James Peed MA - 1853 
 Rev. David H. Elrington - 1855 
 Rev. William J. Mulloy - 1857 
 Rev. John Digby Cooke - 1865

Closure as a Home
It was agreed to sell Kirwan House on the North Circular Road in 1955, and in 1959 the Home moved to 134 Sandford Road, Ranelagh which itself was sold in 1987, and funds put into the Kirwan House Trust. A tombstone was erected following donations in 1859 on a plot in Mount Jerome Cemetery, Dublin, where orphans who died were interred in without their names.

A former matron of the orphanage, Eliza Shiels, is buried in a marked grave beside the Homes plot. The Thomas Pleasants Trust and the T.P. Dormer Trust were merged with Kirwan House Trust.

The building was sold and home and church were demolished, despite hopes, that some of the architecture would be preserved. In 1972, it was developed as a Hotel. An office block called Park House was developed on the site, where Annamoe Road joins the North Circular Road. In 2017, Dublin Institute of Technology, now known as Technological University Dublin acquired Park House.

Today
Since 1991 (two hundred since the charities foundation), Kirwan House has operated as a Trust Fund to award bursaries to assist in the education of children who were Church of Ireland or of other Reformed Faith/Protestant Churches in Ireland, who were in need.

The name Kirwan House was used as the name of the girls residential home, in the 2016 film Sing Street.

See also
 Bethany Home
 Belvedere Protestant Children's Orphanage
 Bethesda Chapel and Female Orphan School, Dorset Street, Dublin.
 Westbank Orphanage
 PACT (Protestant Adoption Society)

References

1791 establishments in Ireland
Burials at Mount Jerome Cemetery and Crematorium
Church of Ireland buildings and structures in Ireland